Cooper Hewitt, Smithsonian Design Museum is a design museum housed within the Andrew Carnegie Mansion in Manhattan, New York City, along the Upper East Side's Museum Mile. It is one of 19 museums that operate within the Smithsonian Institution and is one of three Smithsonian facilities located in New York City, the other two being the National Museum of the American Indian's George Gustav Heye Center in Bowling Green and the Archives of American Art New York Research Center in the Flatiron District. Unlike other Smithsonian museums, Cooper Hewitt is not free to the public and charges an admissions fee to visitors. It is the only museum in the United States devoted to historical and contemporary design. Its collections and exhibitions explore approximately 240 years of design aesthetic and creativity.

History

In 1895, the granddaughters of Peter Cooper, Sarah Cooper Hewitt, Eleanor Garnier Hewitt and Amy Hewitt Green, asked the Cooper Union for a space to create a Museum for the Arts of Decoration. The museum would take its inspiration from the Musée des Arts Décoratifs, Paris and would serve as a place for Cooper Union students and professional designers to study decorative arts collections. Cooper Union's trustees provided the fourth floor of the Foundation Building. It opened in 1897 as the "Cooper Union Museum for the Arts of Decoration." The museum was free and open to the public three days a week.

The three sisters served as directors of the Museum until Sarah Cooper Hewitt died in 1930. After her death, four directors were appointed to run the museum. Constance P. Hare served as chair. In 1938, Edwin S. Burdell became the director of the Cooper Union. The museum became his responsibility. The board of directors was abolished and an advisory council was established.

Eventually the museum and art school started to distance themselves from one another in regards to programming. Other departments of the Cooper Union were making financial demands, and the Cooper Union announced that they would close the museum. This led to the museum being closed on July 3, 1963. Public outcry was strong against the closing. A Committee to Save the Cooper Union Museum was formed by Henry Francis Du Pont. The American Association of Museums (now the American Alliance of Museums) developed a case study about the future of the museum. Negotiations then began between the Cooper Union and the Smithsonian Institution. On October 9, 1967, Smithsonian Secretary S. Dillon Ripley and Daniel Maggin, the chair of the board of trustees, signed an agreement turning over the collection and library of the museum to the Smithsonian. On May 14, 1968, the New York Supreme Court approved the agreement and the museum fell under ownership of the Smithsonian. July 1, 1968, it was officially transferred to the Smithsonian, and the museum was renamed the Cooper-Hewitt Museum of Design. The following year, 1969, it was renamed as the Cooper-Hewitt Museum of Decorative Arts and Design. In October of that year, Lisa Taylor became the director.

The museum, which was the first Smithsonian museum outside of Washington, D.C., moved to its home at the Andrew Carnegie Mansion in 1970. The Mansion was renovated and the museum opened to the public on October 7, 1976, with the exhibition "MAN transFORMs". A conservation laboratory was opened in July 1978. The Samuel H. Kress Foundation funded the lab and it focuses on textile and paper conservation. Lisa Taylor retired in 1987 and in 1988 Dianne H. Pilgrim took her place as Director.
That same year, the museum's name was changed again to Cooper–Hewitt, National Design Museum. Pilgrim retired from the museum in 2000. In 2000, Paul W. Thompson became Director.
From 2010 to 2012, Bill Moggridge, a co-founder of IDEO and designer of the first laptop computer, served as Cooper-Hewitt's director. On June 17, 2014, the museum's name was changed again to Cooper Hewitt, Smithsonian Design Museum. A new graphic identity, wordmark, and new website were launched on this day. The identity was designed by Eddie Opara of Pentagram. The website was developed by Matcha Labs.

The museum began preparing for renovations in 2008. The mansion was closed to the public in July 2011, to begin the renovation period during which it held exhibitions at the headquarters of the United Nations and on Governor's Island. The museum opened a new online retail shop in 2012. In 2012, the Cooper-Hewitt created an additional space in Harlem as an education facility. Designer Todd Oldham donated design services for the space. Thirteen design firms were hired to work on the project, with total costs for the renovations totaling $91 million.

In June 2014, the museum changed its name from Cooper-Hewitt, National Design Museum to Cooper Hewitt, Smithsonian Design Museum. On December 12, 2014, the Cooper Hewitt reopened to the public. Renovations included an "Immersion Room", an interactive space that provides visitors digital access to the museums collection of wallpaper. The main exhibition space was expanded and the museum had a custom open-source font, which remains available for free download and modification, designed for its reopening. In 2015, the terrace and garden renovations were completed and opened to the public, with design led by Walter Hood.

In 2016 the museum introduced the use of digital pens for visitors.

Museum building

The Cooper Hewitt is located in the Andrew Carnegie Mansion. The Georgian style mansion was built over the course of the years 1899 to 1902 and has 64 rooms. The home served as not only the home for Andrew Carnegie, his wife, and daughter, but also as his office for his philanthropic work after his retirement. The mansion was designed by Babb, Cook & Willard. It was the first private residence in the United States to have a structural steel frame. It was the first home in New York to have an Otis elevator. The elevator is now in the collection of the National Museum of American History. The home also had central heating and an early form of air-conditioning. The property has a large private garden. In 1974 it was added to the National Register of Historic Places. The conservatory, which is made of Tiffany glass, was renovated in 1975. In 1995, the museum closed for a year for a $20 million renovation to connect the three buildings on the property, improve accessibility, and build a design study center. Funds for the 1995 renovation project included $13 million from the Smithsonian Institution and a $2 million donation by Agnes Bourne, an interior designer.

In 2008, the museum started to undergo renovations. The renovation cost $91 million and was the largest in the museum's history, partially financed by the museum endowment. The museum reopened on December 12, 2014. Additional renovations were completed in 2015, including the property gardens. To celebrate the reopening of the museum, the Cooper Hewitt released a downloadable 3D scan of the building, allowing users to explore the mansion from their computer, reuse and remix it, and print a 3D printer version of the building. It was released under a Creative Commons Zero license.

Collections

The Cooper Hewitt collections consist of decorative and design objects. The museum's original collection focused on architecture, sculpture, painted architecture, decorative arts, woodwork, metalwork, pottery, costume, musical instruments and furniture. Upon its opening, Abram S. Hewitt's wife, Sarah Amelia Hewitt donated a lace collection, George Hearn donated two fountains worth $1,000, and Lloyd Bryce's wife donated art and objects from the Palace of Fontainebleau.

The museum had a metalwork gallery, which showcased historic iron grillwork and a room devoted to ironwork, both which no longer are focus rooms. The museum has a wide variety of objects in its collection, ranging from matchbooks, to shopping bags, porcelain from the Soviet Union, and the papers of graphic designer Tibor Kalman. The museum holds the world's largest collection of works on paper by Hudson River School painter Frederic Edwin Church.

The museum has held notable objects in its collection such as a chair used by Abraham Lincoln during a visit to the Cooper-Union and a Rolls-Royce once owned by the Beatles. The car was donated by John Lennon and Yoko Ono in 1978. In the summer of 1985, the car was auctioned off at Sotheby's for $2.09 million. Museum namesake Peter Cooper created the first steel chair in the United States. One of the chairs resides in the museum collection.

Exhibitions
Exhibitions at the Cooper Hewitt explore the history and culture of design and decorative arts. A 1968 exhibition called "Please Be Seated", focused on contemporary chairs.

In 1977, approximately a year after the museum reopened, "Palaces for the People", was held. The exhibit explored a century of resort and motel architecture in the United States. In 1979, the museum hosted hundreds of objects on loan from various other Smithsonian museums for an exhibit called "Smithsonian", The museum, in 1980, showcased the history and culture of the ocean liner in the exhibition "The Oceanliner: Speed, Style, Symbol". Later that year the "Hair" exhibit featured over 350 objects about the history of hair styles and "Electroworks" covered the history of copy machine art. In conjunction with the National Endowment of the Arts and the National Endowment for the Humanities, the Cooper-Hewitt showcased Scandinavian design. In 1983, the Cooper-Hewitt was the first museum in the United States to exhibit the Amsterdam School.

The museum also tours exhibits through the Smithsonian Institution Traveling Exhibition Service. The first exhibit they toured was 1978's "Close Observation: Selected Oil Sketches by Frederic E. Church". In 1993, the Cooper-Hewitt created the exhibition "The Power of Maps", which was its first exhibition to be shown on the National Mall at the S. Dillon Ripley Gallery. The exhibit featured upwards of 200 maps from around the world. William III and Mary II of England were the focus of a 1988 exhibition. An exhibition featuring 16th- and 17th-century decorative arts from Burghley House.

The jewelry of Van Cleef & Arpels was the focus of an exhibition in 2011. That year, artist Sonia Delaunay had a solo show at the museum. The Cooper-Hewitt worked with the Walker Art Center, in 2012, to develop "Graphic Design – Now In Production", which showcases graphic design that has been created since 2000. An additional exhibition was held in 2012, in light of the museum's closing due to renovations, at the United Nations Headquarters called "Design With the Other 90% Cities", about design and global issues.

Other exhibitions at the museum have included Puiforcat silver, wallpaper, the works of Alexander Girard, and universal design. In 2015, the museum hosted The Algorithm Auction, the world's first auction of computer algorithms.

In Cooper Hewitt's Face Values installation for the LONDON DESIGN BIENNALE 2018, a live facial data became the basis of dynamic graphic images and provocative conversations between humans and machines. The exhibition explored alternative uses of technologies that were typically used for security, surveillance, and behavioural profiling. Curatoed by Ellen Lupton, the installation was awarded with the LONDON DESIGN BIENNALE EMOTIONAL STATED MEDAL WINNER 2018.

Outreach
The museum's National Design Education Center is sponsored by Target. Ongoing programs for preschoolers on up are offered, along with summer camps, professional development, educator resources, and even a master's program. In 2012, the Cooper Hewitt started work on a design center in Harlem to "encourage students and their teachers to think like designers, approach the world in a visual way and better understand the role design plays in their everyday lives." The center, which was designed by Todd Oldham and sponsored by Target, provided free workshops and programming.

Initiatives
The Cooper Hewitt is home to the National Design Awards. They also support a master's degree program offered in conjunction with Parsons School of Design. In 2006, the Cooper Hewitt and Mayor Michael Bloomberg declared October 15–21 National Design Week in New York City. The week focuses on outreach throughout the city, including schools, and organizations across the United States. The museum is free for the week. The museum sponsored a bike rack competition in 2008. The winners of the contest were a part of an exhibition at the museum.

Management
In July 2009, director Paul W. Thompson left the museum to become the rector of the Royal College of Art. In January 2010, Bill Moggridge replaced Thompson as Director. Moggridge was the first designer to head the museum, he remained director until his death in 2012.

In 2013, Caroline Baumann was appointed as Director of the museum. She remained the Director until February 2020, when she was forced to resign after an investigation led by the Smithsonian concerning her wedding to her partner, John Stewart Malcolmson, on September 17, 2018. Maria Nicanor was announced as director in February 2022.

The museum began a capital campaign in 2006, hoping to raise $79 million for the renovation and $10 million for its endowment.

The Cooper Hewitt is the only Smithsonian museum to charge an admission fee to visitors. The museum receives approximately $500,000 in revenue from admissions.

Publications
 Design and Social Impact: A Cross-Sectoral Agenda for Design Education, Research and Practice (2013). New York: Cooper-Hewitt, National Design Museum.
 Chronicle of the 2012 Social Impact Design Summit where practitioners and educators surveyed their emerging field of socially responsible design. Organized by Cooper Hewitt, The Lemelson Foundation, and the National Endowment for the Arts, with support from the Surdna Foundation, the day-long event was held at The Rockefeller Foundation offices in New York.

References

Further reading
Dolkart, Andrew. Cooper-Hewitt, National Design Museum: The Andrew and Louise Carnegie Mansion : Art Spaces. New York: Scala Publishers (2002). 
 Ewing, Heather. (2014). Life of a Mansion: The Story of Cooper Hewitt, Smithsonian Design Museum. Cooper Hewitt, Smithsonian Design Museum, New York.

External links

Collection
Cooper Hewitt, Smithsonian Design Museum within Google Arts & Culture

1897 establishments in New York City
1968 establishments in New York City
Art museums established in 1897
Andrew Carnegie
Cooper Union
Decorative arts museums in the United States
Design museums in New York (state)
Smithsonian Institution museums
Art museums and galleries in New York City
Museums in Manhattan
Upper East Side
Fifth Avenue
Design museums in the United States